Quantum foam or spacetime foam is a theoretical quantum fluctuation of spacetime on very small scales due to quantum mechanics. The theory predicts that at these small scales, particles of matter and antimatter are constantly created and destroyed. These subatomic objects are called virtual particles. The idea was devised by John Wheeler in 1955.

Background

With an incomplete theory of quantum gravity, it is impossible to be certain what spacetime would look like at small scales. However, there is no definitive reason that spacetime needs to be fundamentally smooth. It is possible that instead, in a quantum theory of gravity, spacetime would consist of many small, ever-changing regions in which space and time are not definite, but fluctuate in a foam-like manner.

Wheeler suggested that the uncertainty principle might imply that over sufficiently small distances and sufficiently brief intervals of time, the "very geometry of spacetime fluctuates". These fluctuations could be large enough to cause significant departures from the smooth spacetime seen at macroscopic scales, giving spacetime a "foamy" character.

Experimental results 

The experimental proof of the Casimir effect, which is possibly caused by virtual particles, is strong evidence for the existence of virtual particles. The g2 experiment, which predicts the strength of magnets formed by muons and electrons also supports their existence.

In 2005, during observations of gamma-ray photons arriving from the blazar Markarian 501, MAGIC (Major Atmospheric Gamma-ray Imaging Cherenkov) telescopes detected that,  some of the photons at different energy levels arrived at different times, suggesting that some of the photons had moved more slowly and thus were in violation of special relativity's notion that the speed of light is constant, a discrepancy which could be explained by the irregularity of quantum foam. More recent experiments were, however, unable to confirm the supposed variation on the speed of light due to graininess of space.

Other experiments involving the polarization of light from distant gamma ray bursts have also produced contradictory results. More Earth-based experiments are ongoing or proposed.

Constraints on the size of quantum fluctuations

The fluctuations characteristic of a spacetime foam would be expected to occur on a length scale on the order of the Planck length (≈ 10−35 m), but some models of quantum gravity predict much larger fluctuations.

Photons should be slowed down by quantum foam, with the rate depending on the wavelength of the photons. This would violate Lorentz invariance. But observations of radiation from nearby quasars by Floyd Stecker of NASA's Goddard Space Flight Center failed to find evidence of violation of Lorentz invariance.

A foamy spacetime also sets limits on the accuracy with which distances can be measured because photons should diffuse randomly through a spacetime foam, similar to light diffusing by passing through fog. This should cause the image quality of very distant objects observed through telescopes to degrade. X-ray and gamma-ray observations of quasars using NASA's Chandra X-ray Observatory, the Fermi Gamma-ray Space Telescope and ground-based gamma-ray observations from the Very Energetic Radiation Imaging Telescope Array (VERITAS) showed no detectable degradation at the farthest observed distances, implying that spacetime is smooth at least down to distances 1000 times smaller than the nucleus of a hydrogen atom, setting a bound on the size of quantum fluctuations of spacetime.

Relation to other theories
The vacuum fluctuations provide vacuum with a non-zero energy known as vacuum energy.

Spin foam theory is a modern attempt to make Wheeler's idea quantitative.

See also

 Geon
 Hawking radiation
 Holographic principle
 Lorentzian wormhole
 Planck time
 Stochastic quantum mechanics
 String theory
 Wormhole
 Loop quantum gravity

Notes

References
 Minkel, JR (24 November 2003). "Borrowed Time: Interview with Michio Kaku". Scientific American
 Swarup, A. (2006). "Sights set on quantum froth". New Scientist, 189, p. 18, accessed 10 February 2012.

Quantum gravity
Wormhole theory